Vasil Tsolov (born 19 August 1927) was a Bulgarian equestrian. He competed in two events at the 1960 Summer Olympics.

References

External links
 

1927 births
Possibly living people
Bulgarian male equestrians
Olympic equestrians of Bulgaria
Equestrians at the 1960 Summer Olympics
People from Berkovitsa
20th-century Bulgarian people